This is a list of synagogues, Jewish houses of prayer, in Bulgaria.

References

External links

Dimana Trankova, Anthony Georgieff, Guide to Jewish Bulgaria, Vagabond Media Sofia 2011

Synagogues in Bulgaria
 
Bulgaria